Aequatorium rimachianum is a species of flowering plant in the family Asteraceae.
It is found only in Peru.

References

rimachianum
Flora of Peru
Vulnerable plants
Taxonomy articles created by Polbot